Glenn O'Shea (born 14 June 1989, Swan Hill) is an Australian track cyclist who won the Omnium at the 2012 UCI Track Cycling World Championships. He was also a member of the Australian team that won silver in the team pursuit at the 2012 World Championships and the 2012 Olympics.

O'Shea briefly quit cycling as an under-23 in 2010 after contracting a severe case of glandular fever. However, after a representing the Australia in team pursuit and omnium in both the Worlds and the Olympics in 2012, he joined the  continental cycling team for 2013. He started the 2013 Tour of Britain as lead-out man for Steele Von Hoff.

He remained with  into 2014. In 2014, he won gold in the men's team pursuit (in a new Games record) and silver in the men's scratch race at the 2014 Commonwealth Games.  In November 2014 O'Shea was announced as part of the Team Budget Forklifts line-up for 2015 alongside fellow members of the Australian endurance track squad Luke Davison, Jack Bobridge, Scott Sunderland and Mitchel Mulhearn, riding a domestic programme with a focus on achieving success on the track at the 2016 Summer Olympics. O'Shea signed for ONE Pro Cycling for 2016.

Major results

Track

2007
World Junior Championships
1st  Omnium
1st  Team pursuit
2nd Madison
Oceania Championships
1st Omnium
1st Scratch
1st  National Madison Championships
National Junior Championships
1st  Points race
2nd Kilo
2nd Omnium
2008
National Championships
1st  Madison
1st  Team pursuit
1st  Omnium
3rd Points race
UIV Cup U23
1st Amsterdam
1st Munich
1st Points race World Cup – Melbourne
2009
National Championships
1st  Scratch
1st  Points race
2nd Team pursuit
World Cup – Beijing
1st Madison
1st Team pursuit
2010
1st  National Madison Championships
2011
National Championships
1st  Team pursuit
2nd Points race
2nd Madison
3rd Scratch
World Cup – Astana
1st Madison
1st Individual pursuit
2nd Six Days of Zurich
2012
World Championships
1st  Omnium
2nd Team pursuit
1st  National Team Pursuit Championships
1st Omnium World Cup – Beijing
1st Six Days of Ghent
2nd Olympic Games Team pursuit
2013
World Championships
1st  Team pursuit
3rd Omnium
National Championships
1st  Kilo
1st  Team pursuit
2014
National Championships
1st  Points race
1st  Team pursuit
2nd Scratch
Commonwealth Games
1st Team pursuit
2nd Scratch
2015
World Championships
2nd Omnium

Road racing

2008
 4th Grafton–Inverell
 6th Overall Thüringen Rundfahrt der U23
2011
 5th Overall Canberra Tour
1st Stage 4
2013
 3rd Overall Ronde de l'Oise
1st Stage 2
 6th Ronde van Limburg
2014
 8th Overall Herald Sun Tour
2016
 1st Stage 1 (TTT) Ronde van Midden-Nederland

References

External links
Cycling Australia Profile
London Olympics Profile

1989 births
Australian male cyclists
Commonwealth Games gold medallists for Australia
Commonwealth Games silver medallists for Australia
Cyclists at the 2012 Summer Olympics
Cyclists at the 2016 Summer Olympics
Cyclists at the 2014 Commonwealth Games
Living people
Medalists at the 2012 Summer Olympics
Olympic cyclists of Australia
Olympic medalists in cycling
Olympic silver medalists for Australia
People from Swan Hill
Cyclists from Victoria (Australia)
UCI Track Cycling World Champions (men)
Commonwealth Games medallists in cycling
Australian track cyclists
Medallists at the 2014 Commonwealth Games